is a Japanese animator, director, and screenwriter.
He began his career as an animator in the mid-1980s and worked as a freelance artist through Neomedia, Studio Zaendo, and Studio Ghibli.
 
Iso is known for his offbeat key animation in the prologue of Gundam 0080, large portions of Asuka's battle in The End of Evangelion and the first half of the tank battle in Ghost in the Shell.

Career 
Iso has worked on Mobile Suit Zeta Gundam and Gundam ZZ since 1985 as a key animator and in-betweener.
This led him to secretly work in the 1988 film Mobile Suit Gundam: Char's Counterattack under the pseudonym Mikio Odagawa without telling Zaendo, where he was at the time.
He was then asked by Sunrise, an animation studio, to act as an intermediary for job offers to the company, and worked under his real name as a job through the company.
Sunrise also hired him as an animation director, so he worked under that pseudonym.
 
The battle scene at the beginning of the 1989 OVA Mobile Suit Gundam 0080: War in the Pocket made a strong impression on the anime industry and anime fans about Iso.
Until then, mobile suits (humanoid giant robots) had mostly been depicted as a whole "mass", but Iso thought that if it was a machine body, it should be separated from the skeleton (chassis), and realized an animation in which the robot's material and structure could be seen. He also carefully picked up the details of secondary effects such as air resistance to missile launches and vehicles floating in the blast to create realistic battle scenes. In particular, his drawing philosophy of accumulating what could happen on the screen had a great influence on the drawing of realistic anime in the following years.
In this work, an explosion effect called "Iso Explosion" is noticeable.
Director Fumihiko Takayama gave him the opportunity to do some niche design work, and he designed some of the mecha designs and military equipment.

He was with Studio Ghibli from 1990-1992.
Iso drew keyframes in Only Yesterday, Porco Rosso, Ocean Waves.

Iso joined Roujin Z (1991), based on Katsuhiro Otomo's manga, as a mechanical designer at the request of director Hiroyuki Kitakubo. He was supposed to be both the mechanical designer and mechanical animation director, but ended up doing only a partial design as he was asked to join Only Yesterday.

Iso found about Neon Genesis Evangelion (1995-1997) quite early on and joined from the planning stages. He was involved in all aspects of the planning process, including not only the key frames but also the setting and plot.
He originally joined the project as an animator, but he actively entered other jobs by freely coming up with various ideas and writing about them to the director, Hideaki Anno, every day. 
As an animator, he drew the urban battle between Sachiel and the UN forces in episode 1 of the TV series, the scene where EVA Unit-01 preys on Zeruel in episode 19, additional scenes in the video format version of episode 21, and the battle between EVA Unit-02 and EVA Mass Production Units in the movie The End of Evangelion (episode 25 of the video version).
He also wrote the script for episode 13 with Akio Satsukawa and Hideaki Anno.
Iso's first draft was too long, so Satsukawa summarized it, and director Anno made some changes.
The ending of the final draft was a little disappointing for Iso because it was forcibly connected to a plot that he had planned to use in another episode.
In these episodes 13 and 15, Iso also supplemented the settings.
As a designer, he drew Lilith, Seele marks, rough sketches of underground facilities, etc.
Other than that, Iso created many other settings, including unofficial and unused ones, and although his name is not credited, his ideas are utilized throughout the work. Especially in the middle of the TV series, many of the dialogues and plots created by Iso are used.

In Ghost in the Shell (1995), he not only drew the key animations, but also designed all the firearms.

In FLCL (2000), he drew the key animations, but he worked with director Kazuya Tsurumaki for about six months on a preliminary project, and some of his ideas were adopted. However, the project itself was not realized because Iso put out too many ideas and made it like his own.

In Blood: The Last Vampire (2000), he was in charge of keyframes and visual effects, and also did some design work.
Iso appealed to director Hiroyuki Kitakubo and was entrusted with cinematography and special effects for his own key animations parts.
Production I.G's introduction of computers in their studios made it possible for the key animators to add special effects to their key animations, which had previously been assigned to the cinematographer.

In Rahxephon (2002), he began working in the Digital Works and cinematographer positions throughout this television series, using special effects and CG to modify drawings and art.
In episode 15 (The Children's Night), he wrote the script, storyboarded, and directed, and was also in charge of some of the drawing and cinematography, overseeing a cross-section of jobs that were originally divided.
This was the first time he had worked on storyboarding and directing.
Iso decided to join the work on the condition that he would work on an entire episode by himself.

In the animation part of the live-action film Kill Bill: Volume 1 (2003), he drew the key animation.

In 2007, he directed his first animated television series, Dennō Coil. He also wrote the original and the script for all episodes. With this work, he won the Nihon SF Taisho Award and the Seiun Award as a science fiction writer.

In the same year, Iso and French animation studio yapiko animation announced at Japan Expo 2016 that they would jointly produce Les Pirates de la Reunion Le Reveil des dodos.
However, there has been no further news about it since then.

Iso announced the production of The Orbital Children in 2018, and began full-scale production of the film in 2020.

Style 
Mitsuo Iso is known for his jerky yet detailed animation, full of dense sophisticated motion. He refers to his own style as "full limited". In traditional animation, animation with a drawing count below one drawing every two frames (or "on twos") is considered limited animation. Mixing twos, threes and fours in a balanced form of timing, Iso draws every keyframe without passing his work to an in-betweener, allowing him full control to create the most detailed motion possible with a balanced and efficient number of drawings, hence the term "full limited".
Iso's idea of "full limited" is a method for controlling the image from the animator's standpoint, and he has the calculation that if he draws everything in key animation, the timesheets will not be modified by the director.

Iso's thoroughgoing drawing style is highly supported not only by anime fans but also by animators in the same industry.
He was one of the animators who played a central role in the movement from the late 1980s to the 1990s, when "realistic" oriented expressions matured in Japanese animation drawing, by creating animation drawings that were described as "realistic", such as depictions of characters and mechanics that made us feel weight and mass, and effects such as explosions and smoke flames.
His drawings are very realistic and photorealistic, and the reality of his movements comes from his thorough, scientific observation. On the other hand, he has never abandoned the appeal of animation, such as entertainment and showiness.

Iso has covered a wide variety of genres and professions, and has demonstrated his talent in each of them. 
What distinguishes him as an animator is his willingness to go beyond the confines of his section, which has allowed him to pioneer a new expression of animation.
Since the production site of commercial animation is a race against time, the division of labor is common, with each process divided into smaller sections and job categories defined so as not to encroach on each other's job areas. However, Iso goes beyond this framework with the belief that the overall quality of the work will definitely be higher if he is aware of the process before and after.

Every time Iso makes a new work, he takes on a new role other than animator, such as screenplay for Evangelion, cinematographer for Blood: The Last Vampire, and direction for Rahxephon, new techniques such as digital animation, computer graphics, and special effects, new drawing tools and software.
The reason why he finally worked on cinematography is because animators can only leave the rest to the post-process once they have finished drawing with black and white lines, but if they work on cinematography, they can complete the scene by themselves.

Iso has a consistent orientation of wanting to dig deep and touch something that lies at the root of a work, even if it is someone else's work. This is in line with his orientation as an animator to deconstruct the principles of movement.
The visual image that integrates the world view, setting, design, drawing, and cinematography of the work was already in his mind when he was working on other directors' works.

When he participates in anime works as an animator, he often uses aliases or does not give his name.

There are a lot of things that he wants to do, so he cannot fit into just one staff. As a result, he tends to make other director's work his own.

Works

Awards 
 The Excellence Award in the Animation Division of the 2007 Japan Media Arts Festival
 The 29th Nihon SF Taisho Award (2008)
 The Best Dramatic Presentation of the 39th Seiun Award (2008)
 The Best TV Animation Award of the 7th Tokyo Anime Award (2008)
 Individual Award at the 13th Animation Kobe (2008)

Notes

Citations

References

External links

Mitsuo Iso interview concerning RahXephon #15
Anipages Mitsuo Iso overview
http://www18.atwiki.jp/sakuga/pages/52.html
http://www.lares.dti.ne.jp/~iso-000/index.html

Japanese animators
Anime directors
Japanese animated film directors
Japanese film directors
Science fiction film directors
Anime character designers
Japanese storyboard artists
Japanese screenwriters
Anime screenwriters
Studio Ghibli people
1966 births
Living people
People from Aichi Prefecture